Deiffelt is a village in the commune of Wincrange, in northern Luxembourg.  , the village has a population of 100.

Villages in Luxembourg
Wincrange